The Hermitage of Santa María la Antigua (Spanish: Ermita de Santa María la Antigua) is a hermitage located in Madrid, Spain. It was declared Bien de Interés Cultural in 1981.

References 

Christian hermitages in Spain
Religious buildings and structures in Madrid
Bien de Interés Cultural landmarks in Madrid